Incidents of terrorism in Thailand are mostly related to the South Thailand insurgency, which has been going on for decades. Sporadic incidents have also occurred elsewhere (mostly in Bangkok), although such events are much less common.

List of notable terrorist incidents
 1972 Israeli Bangkok Embassy hostage crisis
 1999 Burmese Embassy Siege
 2006 Bangkok bombings
 2012 Bangkok bombings
 South Thailand insurgency
 December 2009 Narathiwat bombing
 2005 Songkhla bombings
 2006 Hat Yai bombings
 2007 South Thailand bombings
 2007 Songkhla bombings
 2012 Southern Thailand bombings
 2019 Yala attack
 2015 Bangkok bombing
 August 2016 Thailand bombings
 2019 Bangkok bombings

External sources 
 
 
 

 
Terrorism by country
Terrorism in Asia by country
Human rights abuses in Thailand